{{DISPLAYTITLE:C6H4O6}}
The molecular formula C6H4O6 (molar mass: 172.09 g/mol, exact mass: 172.0008 u) may refer to:

 Tetrahydroxy-1,4-benzoquinone
 Tetrahydroxy-1,2-benzoquinone